Magaguadavic is a settlement in New Brunswick.

History

Notable people

See also
List of communities in New Brunswick
Magaguadavic Lake
Magaguadavic River

References

Settlements in New Brunswick
Communities in York County, New Brunswick